The orangeface angelfish (Chaetodontoplus chrysocephalus), also known as the blue vermiculate angelfish or maze angelfish, is a species of marine ray-finned fish, a marine angelfish belonging to  the family Pomacanthidae. It is found in the Pacific Ocean.

Description
The orange face angelfish has a brownish-orange face which contrasts with the body’s pattern of greenish-blue stripes. The body darkens to dark brown towards the vivid yellow caudal fin. The dorsal fin contains 13 spines and 17-18 soft rays while the anal fin contains 3 spines and 17-18 soft rays.

Distribution
The orange face angelfish is found in the western Pacific Ocean. It is a poorly known species which has been reliably reported only from the Java Sea of Indonesia. Records from other areas, such as the Philippines or Taiwan, are considered likely to be attributable to misidentifications of related species notably C. caeruleopunctatus and C. cephalareticulatus. The most recent report was around the year 2002 at Karimnjawa on the Java Sea.

Habitat and biology 
However, the biology of this species is very poorly known, it is thought that it is likely to live on deep rocky reefs. Its diet consists of sponges and tunicates.

Systematics
The orangeface angelfish was first formally described in 1855 as Holocanthus chrysocephalus by the Dutch ichthyologist, herpetologist and physician Pieter Bleeker (1819-1878) with the type locality given as Jakarta. The specific name is a compound of the Greek chrysos meaning “gold” and cephalus meaning “head”, a reference to the yellowish-orange head colour.

Utilisation
The orangeface angelfish occurs extremely infrequently in the aquarium trade.

References

ITIS.gov
Allen, G.R., 1985. Butterfly and angelfishes of the world. Vol. 2. 3rd edit. in English. Mergus Publishers, Melle, Germany. 

Fish described in 1855
Orangeface angelfish